The Jim Backus Show is a 39-episode American television sitcom that aired in broadcast syndication in 1960 and 1961. The series was also known as Hot Off the Wire.

Premise
The program focuses on Backus in the role of Mike O'Toole, the editor/proprietor of a low rent wire service struggling to stay in business.

Cast
 Jim Backus as Mike O'Toole
 Nita Talbot as Dora Miles
 Bobs Watson as Sidney

Episodes

 "The Woman's Touch" with George Ives as a bigamist con man, Douglas Aldrich.
 "Floundered in Florida" with Alan Carney as Hogan, Milton Frome as Irving Rudolph, Vivi Janiss as Mrs. Rudolph, and Olan Soule as Elmo

References

First-run syndicated television programs in the United States
1960 American television series debuts
1961 American television series endings
1960s American sitcoms
1960s American workplace comedy television series
Television series by CBS Studios
Black-and-white American television shows
English-language television shows
Television series about journalism